The following is a list of municipal presidents of the city of León, Mexico.

List of officials

 Lorenzo Rodríguez Garza, 1967-1969 
 Arturo Valdéz Sánchez, 1970-1972 
 , 1973 
 José Arturo Lozano Madrazo, 1974-1976 
 Roberto Plascencia Saldaña, 1977-1979 
 Harold Gabriel Appelt, 1980-1982 
 Rodolfo Padilla Padilla, 1982-1984 
 Antonio Torres Gómez, 1984-1985 
 Antonio Hernández Ornelas, 1986-1987 
 Arturo Villegas Torres, 1987-1988 
 Carlos Medina Plascencia, 1988-1991 
 Facundo Castro Chávez, 1991 
 , 1992-1994 
 Luis Manuel Quirós Echegaray, 1995-1997 
 Jorge Carlos Obregón Serrano, 1998-2000 
 Luis Ernesto Ayala Torres, 2000–2003, 2018 
 Ricardo Alaniz Posada, 2003-2006 
 , 2006-2009 
 , 2009-2012 
 Bárbara Botello Santibáñez, 2012-2015 
 Octavio Augusto Villasana Delfín, 2012-2015 
 , 2015-current

See also
 
 Timeline of León, Mexico

References

Leon
People from León, Guanajuato
History of Guanajuato